Sir Thomas Oates, CMG, OBE (5 November 1917 – 28 June 2015) was a British colonial administrator. He was Governor of Saint Helena from 1971 to 1976.

Notable cases 
Tony Thornton arrived on St Helena in 1967 and remained until Oates made an Exclusion Order against him in September 1975, claiming he was a Communist. Thornton was a controversial businessman who had made many changes in agriculture and standards of living. In 1975, Thornton had formed the St Helena Labour Party, aiming to contest the 1975 general election for Legislative Council, but was served the Exclusion Order before the election could be held.

References

External links
 Sir Thomas Oates at UK Whoswho 

British colonial governors and administrators in Africa
Governors of Saint Helena
1917 births
2015 deaths